Stands for Decibels is the debut studio album by American power pop band the dB's, released January 15, 1981 by Albion Records. The album was commercially unsuccessful but critically acclaimed.

At the time of its release, the dB's consisted of singer/guitarists Chris Stamey and Peter Holsapple, bassist Gene Holder, and drummer Will Rigby. The songwriting was evenly divided between Stamey and Holsapple, although Stamey became known for writing the stranger, more avant-garde numbers ("She's Not Worried", "Espionage"), while Holsapple wrote the more accessible, poppier songs ("Black and White", "Bad Reputation"). Both Stamey and Holsapple played keyboards occasionally as well. Holder and Rigby did not receive any songwriting credits (other than a group credit for "Dynamite").

The album was dedicated to George Scott III. "Black and White" was released as the band's first single. I.R.S. Records reissued the album on CD in 1989.

Reception

In The Village Voices year-end Pazz & Jop poll, Stands for Decibels was voted by critics as the 26th best album of 1981.

In a retrospective review for AllMusic, Chris Woodstra stated: "On their debut, the dB's combined a reverence for British pop and arty, post-punk leanings that alternate between minimalism and a love of quirky embellishment, odd sounds, and unexpected twists; Stands for Decibels is clearly a collegiate pop experiment, but rarely is experimentation so enjoyable and irresistibly catchy." He concluded that the album "stands not only as a landmark power pop album, but also as a prototype for much of the Southern jangle that would follow." Stands for Decibels was ranked at number 76 on Pitchforks list of the 100 best albums of the 1980s.

Track listing
Side 1
 "Black and White" (Peter Holsapple) – 3:09
 "Dynamite" (Gene Holder, Holsapple, Will Rigby, Chris Stamey) – 2:35
 "She's Not Worried" (Stamey) – 3:04
 "The Fight" (Holsapple) – 2:54
 "Espionage" (Stamey) – 2:39
 "Tearjerkin'" (Stamey) – 3:56

Side 2
 "Cycles per Second" (Stamey) – 3:06
 "Bad Reputation" (Holsapple) – 3:11
 "Big Brown Eyes" (Holsapple) – 1:58
 "I'm in Love" (Stamey) – 3:29
 "Moving in Your Sleep" (Holsapple) – 4:35

Some later CD versions (including the 1992 compilation dB's First/Repercussion) add two bonus tracks: "Baby Talk" (writer: Stamey, length: 1:50) as track 7, and "Judy" (writer: Holsapple, length: 2:48) as track 13.

Personnel
Credits are adapted from the album's liner notes.

The dB's
Gene Holder – bass guitar
Peter Holsapple – guitar, vocals
Will Rigby – drums
Chris Stamey – guitar, vocals

Technical
Alan Betrock – production
Stephanie Chernikowski – photography
The dB's – production
Victoria DeVeraux – painting
Malcolm Garrett – typography

References

External links

Discography at official website

The dB's albums
1981 debut albums
I.R.S. Records albums